The 2020 Derry Senior Hurling Championship was the 75th staging of the Derry Senior Hurling Championship since its establishment by the Derry County Board in 1887. The championship had been scheduled to begin earlier, however, it was postponed indefinitely due to the impact of the COVID-19 pandemic on Gaelic games. The draw for the group stage placings took place on 25 June 2020. The championship eventually began on 25 July 2020 and ended on 13 September 2020.

Slaughtneil entered the championship as the defending champions.

The final was played on 13 September 2020 at Celtic Park, between Slaughtneil and Kevin Lynch's, in what was their second successive meeting in a final. Slaughneil won the match by 0-23 to 0-11 to claim their 14th championship title overall and an eighth title in succession.

Results

Semi-finals

Final

References

External links
 Derry GAA website

Westmeath Senior Hurling Championship
Derry Senior Hurling Championship
Derry Senior Hurling Championship